Airframes Unlimited was an American aircraft manufacturer founded by Don and Clint Stutts of Athens, Texas. The company started out marketing powered parachute plans on CD-ROM and expanded into providing parts and sub-assemblies, as well as complete airframes.

In an interview in Light Sport and Ultralight Flying Magazine Don Stutts explained his focus on the low-end of the market "Our companies' goal is to make powered parachuting more affordable to the average working man. We are living in an era where $15,000 to $20,000 powered parachutes are common. Powered parachutes in this price range are completely out of reach of an average working man, even with creative financing."

The company originally operated as Powered Parachute Plans, also of Athens, Texas. When parts for complete aircraft were made available these were supplied by Airframes Unlimited and gradually the two enterprises were unified under the latter name.

The company seems to have gone out of business in late 2014.

Aircraft

References

External links

Company website archives on Archive.org

Defunct aircraft manufacturers of the United States
Powered parachutes